Cochylimorpha exoterica is a species of moth of the family Tortricidae. It is found in Kenya, Rwanda and  Tanzania.

The wingspan is 20–26.5 mm. The ground colour of the forewings is cream with fuscous subbasal fascia. The hindwings are cream, the transversely striate with brownish grey.

References

 

E
Moths of Africa
Moths described in 1924